The Rose of Rouen is a fifteenth-century carol, written after the Battle of Towton in 1461, eulogizing the Yorkist leader and later King Edward IV, Edward, Earl of March.

Historical context 
Before the Battle of Towton took place on 29 March 1461, Queen Margaret, wife of Henry VI of England, led the Lancastrian army south, fresh from victory over the Yorkists at the Battle of Wakefield.

Etymology 

The title of the poem reflects its subject. King Edward, son of Richard, Duke of York, had been born in Rouen, France, in 1442, while his father was on campaign. He was, as a young man, described by contemporaries as taller than average, extremely fit and handsome. His cognizance was a rose en soleil, and so was nick-named the Rose of Rouen. This also reinforced his noble parenting as his mother, Cecilly Neville, in praise of her beauty, was called "The Rose of Raby," after the castle of her birth. Edward's connection with the rose continued into his reign, and coins known as "rose nobles" were issued. Edward's birthplace was an important factor in his favour when he was elected king in 1461, as it was thought an omen that Normandy—only recently lost to France in the Hundred Years' War—would be returned to the English.

Creation 
The poem is one of many politically-orientated pieces from the period, and plays heavily on the North—South divide. The army that Margaret brings to the gates of London was northern. Yorkist propaganda heavily emphasised its barbaric nature, particularly fuelling rumours that the Lancastrians were sacking towns as it marched deeper south. The rumours had fertile soil: because, historian Margaret Cron has said, "fear of barbarians from the north was a  race memory in southern minds." The Rose of Rouen was written on the premise that not only would northern lords over-run the south, but more, that "they would then live in it and take what they needed including wives and daughters." This is the fate, says the poem, that Edward of York saved England from.

Text 
Like other political poetry of the period, it is careful to identify its protagonists by their cognizances rather than naming them: Edward, of course, is a white rose, his father Richard of York, Duke of York, is a falcon and fetterlock, Richard Neville, Earl of Warwick a ragged staff, his uncle William Neville, Lord Fauconberg a fish hook, and John Mowbray, Duke of Norfolk by a white lion.

The Rose of Rouen's style has been described as one of "confident Yorkist triumphalism" as it concentrates on the success of Edward's strategy, from the original London muster to Edward's increasing popularity as he marched north (in which, of course, he swelled his army even more). Hence the long list of nobles (and their heraldic symbols) that the poem presents is another aspect of the propaganda, as historically, at Towton, the Queen had the bulk of the English nobility in the Lancastrian army; Edward, on the other hand, had only the Duke of Norfolk, the Earls of Warwick and Arundel, and Lord Fauconberg with him.

Heraldic identification of the nobility

Notes

References

Bibliography 
 
 
 
 
 
 
 
 

Middle English poems
Historical poems
15th century in England
15th-century poems